Dorcadion spinolae is a species of beetle in the family Cerambycidae. It was described by Dalman in 1817, originally under the genus Lamia. It is known from Spain.

Subspecies
 Dorcadion spinolae caunense Lauffer, 1910
 Dorcadion spinolae spinolae Dalman, 1817

See also 
Dorcadion

References

spinolae
Beetles described in 1817